The Oceania Cup is a rugby league tournament for national teams in Oceania. Its inaugural tournament was in 2019.

History 
The tournament was created in 2019 with a two tiered format. The top tier (cup) consisted of Australia, New Zealand and Tonga and the second tier (shield) consisted of Fiji, Samoa and Papua New Guinea. The top team in the cup would be crowned champions while the top team in the shield would be promoted. 

Australia won the Cup in the inaugural season while Fiji won the shield and got promoted for the 2020 competition. No team would be relegated as Australia were going to go on a tour of England, leaving the tournament. 

For the 2020 edition, Cook Islands were schedule to take Fiji's place in the shield.  The competition was scheduled to begin in June and conclude in November, but has since been cancelled due to the COVID-19 pandemic.

Tournaments

By team

References 

Rugby league international tournaments
Oceanian rugby league competitions